Frank Haydn Haigh (2 May 1898–17 July 1992) was a New Zealand lawyer and social reformer. He was born in Lower Hutt, Wellington, New Zealand on 2 May 1898.

He was educated at Southland Boy's High School and Victoria University College, and practiced law in Auckland.

References

1898 births
1992 deaths
20th-century New Zealand lawyers
People from Lower Hutt
New Zealand activists
People educated at Southland Boys' High School
Victoria University of Wellington alumni